Batman/Poison Ivy: Cast Shadows is a 2004 DC Comics one-shot graphic novel featuring the characters Batman and Poison Ivy written by Ann Nocenti and illustrated by John Van Fleet. Cast Shadows follows a mysterious killer, who seems to be carrying out a series of Ivy-like murders. Batman, investigating, discovers they are somehow linked to a new tower that has been blocking out the sunlight to Poison Ivy's cell in Arkham Asylum, as he and Ivy work together to take the killer down. The story also depicts the romantic potential between Batman and Ivy.

Plot
Poison Ivy is tending to her window sill garden in Arkham Asylum where she has created a plant that absorbs sunlight, and then gives it off later, freeing Gotham from the electrical grid. Suddenly, it all goes dark, when industrialist Dan Trimbel's construction of Gotham Tower blocks out the light, much to her grief. She sees her therapist, Doctor Wood. He gives her pills to manage her condition, but she spits them into her chair when he isn't looking. He and Ivy discuss her poison lips, and Ivy tells him that any man who loves her must be insane, or have a death wish. Meanwhile, Batman captures a deranged billionaire art collector, and takes him to Arkham, where Doctor Wood gives him the tour, and has him meet with Ivy, who demonstrates some of her creations, and how they might benefit the world.

Willing to work with him, Ivy aids Batman as he takes the patient to Gotham Hospital where they discover that there is a toxin inside him. There are other victims, including a man who worked in the mailroom of a skyscraper. The mailman is also deranged. His boss has also been brought in to hospital complaining of the same problems. Working together to find the solution, Batman puts Ivy in flesh make up so she can seem normal. Batman rushes to find flowers growing from the Mailman's corpse. He also finds that in the commotion, Ivy has kissed all of the infected patients and they went into sleeps, and a second later, they all woke up cured. Ivy in the meantime has escaped, and Batman takes a sample from a patient and retreats to the Batcave.

There, he finds a flower posted to Bruce Wayne, thanking him for investing in Gotham Tower. His butler, Alfred Pennyworth, notes that Batman has been poisoned by the flowers. Batman tells Alfred he must kiss Poison Ivy for the cure, and that if he fails Alfred must kill him. Batman chases Ivy to the Gotham Tower, where she has Trimbel tied up with her vines. Ivy and Batman confront each other, where Ivy says that Doctor Wood is the one who sent the flowers out, because he wanted Ivy. Ivy went along with it because she did it for everyone who has no light, everyone who lives in grey office cubicles and dark apartments and black prison cells. Batman warns Ivy that he'll have to knock her out to kiss her to make sure that she doesn't kill him when he passes out after being cured. Ivy insists for him to trust her, despite Batman's doubts. Batman at first decides to punch her, hesitates, then they embrace and kiss passionately instead. Upon being cured, he falls, but saves himself, and saves Ivy as Gotham Tower collapses when — assuming Batman dead — Poison Ivy tries to kill herself, once more insinuating that it is more than just lust she feels for him. Ivy and Batman share a moment together speaking, watching her plant creations create light, and Batman compliments her on her talent. Ivy then agrees to cure Trimbel so long as he agrees to stop building Gotham Tower, and he goes into a sleep after accepting this exchange.

In the final scene Batman takes Ivy back to Arkham Asylum, so that Ivy can finish her rehabilitation. Discouraged, Ivy complains to Batman about the lack of light in her cell, and Batman  responds that there is nothing he can do about it, before departing. Ivy is welcomed back by the other patients on that ward. Meanwhile, on the way out Batman pays a visit to Doctor Wood, revealed to now himself be a patient at the asylum for his insanity. Transferred to a new cell the next morning, Ivy is stunned when she discovers that someone has had her room moved to a special cell where she can be in the sunlight, and has been filled with flowers as a gift. Upon being told some "anonymous benefactor" wanted to make sure her time isn't as daunting as it might have been, a touched Ivy smiles and thanks Batman.

Reception
Ray Tate concluded in his review for Comics Bulletin: "Ms. Nocenti creates a credible, original plot that simultaneously provides sympathy and intent for Ivy." He also noted John Van Fleet's unique artwork "work[s] beautifully together" with the story.

References

Batman graphic novels
DC Comics one-shots
2004 comics debuts
Poison Ivy (character)